Freddy Vargas can refer to:

 Freddy Vargas (cyclist)
 Freddy Vargas (Bolivian footballer)
 Freddy Vargas (Venezuelan footballer)